Призрачный Свет (Prizrachnyj Svet - Eerie Light) is the third EP by the Russian power metal band Catharsis. It was released on April 20, 2004 by Irond.

Track listing
"Кто ты? (Kto ty?)"  – 4:26 - Who Are You?
"Помни меня (Pomni menya)"  – 4:30 - Remember Me 
"Призрачный свет (Prizrachnyj svet)"  – 4:08 - Eerie Light
"Сердце Мира - Stillife Remix (Serdtse mira)"  – 4:30 - Heart of the World
"Dancing in the Fire - Necromancer Remix"  – 4:38 
"Eerie Light"  – 4:06

Members
 Oleg Zhilyakov - Vocals, Back Vocals
 Igor 'Jeff' Polyakov - Rhythm Guitar, Acoustic Guitar
 Julia Red - Keyboards
 Oleg Mission - Lead guitar, Acoustic Guitar, Flute, Keyboards
 Andrey Ischenko - Drums
 Alexander Timonin - Bass
 Olga Dzusova - Back Vocals

Catharsis (Russian band) albums
2004 EPs